Lucas is a new suburb created on 23 June 2011. It is located in the City of Ballarat.

History
Lucas is named after Eleanor Lucas and the staff of her local textile company, who planted Ballarat's Avenue of Honour after World War I. Shopping chains like Woolworths and the local Wilson's Fruit and Vegetables have opened stores here with more expected

References

External links

Suburbs of Ballarat